The Beaver Valley Mall is a regional shopping mall located in Center Township, Pennsylvania, serving Beaver County within the Pittsburgh metropolitan area. It is owned by the Namdar Realty Group. Its anchors are Boscov's, Dick's Sporting Goods, JCPenney, and Rural King. The mall offers more than 35 stores and services, and also contains a U-Haul storage center.

History 
In 1970, the Beaver Valley Mall opened with The Joseph Horne Company, Gimbels, and Sears as the original anchors. That same year, the entire Gimbels chain was purchased by the tobacco conglomerate BATUS.  In 1986, after years of declining sales, BATUS announced that Gimbels was on the block. Unable to find a buyer for the entire chain, BATUS closed down the entire Gimbels Pittsburgh division, selling or closing all locations. Some of the more attractive mall locations, such as Beaver Valley Mall, were taken over by the St. Louis based May Department Stores Company for its Pittsburgh-based Kaufmann's division. This effectively caused the shuttering of the entire Gimbels Pittsburgh division.  The Beaver Valley location was closed and completely renovated before reopening as Kaufmann's. After the move to the mall, the original Kaufmann's location in nearby Rochester was subdivided into a Giant Eagle and a Kmart. In 2006, when The May Department Stores Company was purchased by Cincinnati based Federated Department Stores, this location was renamed Macy's.

The Joseph Horne Company (owned by the New York City based Associated Dry Goods Corporation) operated in the Beaver Valley Mall until 1995. In October 1986, The May Department Stores Company merged with Associated Dry Goods Corporation. May promptly sold The Joseph Horne Company to a group of local investors. In 1995, Federated Department Stores acquired Horne's and renamed all former locations under its own Lazarus regional nameplate. In 1998, after operating a few years as Lazarus, Federated closed several locations including the Beaver Valley Mall store. This location was then acquired by and reopened as Boscov's.

JCPenney became the fourth anchor in 1998, with the new location being built right in front of the food court. JCPenney had moved out there from the Northern Lights Shopping Center in nearby Economy due to Beaver County being depressed, and frequent flooding that would not be addressed by the property owner. Dick's Sporting Goods became the fifth anchor in 2007. The store was built in between JCPenney and Boscov's.

In June 2016, the Sears store at Beaver Valley Mall closed. Pennsylvania Real Estate Investment Trust sold the mall to Namdar Realty Group in January 2017. Macy's closed on March 26, 2017.

In December 2017, Rural King announced they would become the new anchor store, taking the place of the former Sears. On March 25, 2018, Rural King held a grand opening for its Beaver Valley Mall store.

U-Haul purchased the former Macy's location in January 2018, and now operates the new storage and showroom within the former location.

On June 4, 2020, it was announced that JCPenney would be closing its doors as part of a plan to close 154 stores nationwide following their Chapter 11 Bankruptcy protection filing in May 2020. On July 9, 2020, however, it was announced that this store had been removed from their store closing list, and would be staying open.

Current Anchors

Boscov's (Former Lazarus/Joseph Horne Company)
Dick's Sporting Goods
JCPenney 
Rural King (Former Sears)
U-Haul (Former Macy's/Kaufmann's/Gimbels)

Chi-Chi's hepatitis A outbreak 
Beaver Valley Mall was the scene of the largest hepatitis A outbreak in U.S. history when 660 people contracted the virus and four people died after eating at the Chi-Chi's Mexican restaurant during the months of October and November in 2003. After a long investigation, it was discovered that scallions imported from Mexico were the cause of the outbreak. The outbreak did not affect restaurants that were not connected to the main mall, but did affect the food court tenants for a period of time as well as putting all of Chi-Chi's locations out of business.

References

External links 
 Beaver Valley Mall

Shopping malls in Metro Pittsburgh
Shopping malls established in 1970
Buildings and structures in Beaver County, Pennsylvania
Tourist attractions in Beaver County, Pennsylvania
Namdar Realty Group